Mauden is a municipality in the district of Altenkirchen, in Rhineland-Palatinate, in western Germany.

References

Altenkirchen (district)